Boston Store may refer to:

Chains named Boston Store
 Boston Stores (California), also known as The Boston Store, with stores near Los Angeles, California, and in Arizona
 Boston Store (Wisconsin)

Individual stores named Boston Store
 Boston Store (Chandler, Oklahoma)
 Boston Store (Erie, Pennsylvania)

Stores originally known as The Boston Store
J. L. Brandeis and Sons
 Edgar Department Stores, originally called "The Boston Store", Brockton, Massachusetts 
 Fowler, Dick & Walker, Wilkes-Barre, PA and Binghamton, NY, which became part of Boscov's
 J. W. Robinson's, originally named "Boston Dry Goods Store", Los Angeles, California 
Sibley's
Wilson's (department store)